Churchill's Secret is a British drama television film first broadcast on ITV1 on 28 February 2016.  The screenplay was written by Stewart Harcourt based on the book The Churchill Secret: KBO by Jonathan Smith. It stars Michael Gambon as Winston Churchill and Romola Garai as Millie Appleyard, his nurse.  Production was supported by PBS, which screened the film as part of its Masterpiece anthology.

Plot
In summer 1953, some eighteen months after Churchill has become Prime Minister of the United Kingdom for a second time, he suffers a serious stroke. Although his illness is kept as secret as possible, when it is unclear whether he will recover, his political friends and foes begin to plot who will be his successor. His wife takes him to their country home, where he is nursed back to health by Nurse Millie Appleyard.

Cast

Winston Churchill - Michael Gambon
Clementine Churchill - Lindsay Duncan
Millie Appleyard - Romola Garai
Charles Wilson, 1st Baron Moran - Bill Paterson
Diana Churchill - Tara Fitzgerald
Sarah Churchill - Rachael Stirling
Jock Colville - Patrick Kennedy
Christopher Soames - Christian McKay
Rab Butler - Chris Larkin
Mary Soames - Daisy Lewis
Max Aitken, 1st Baron Beaverbrook - Matthew Marsh
William Berry, 1st Viscount Camrose - John Standing
Brendan Bracken - James Wilby
Anthony Eden - Alex Jennings
Randolph Churchill - Matthew Macfadyen
Rosie Hopper - Matilda Sturridge
Alcide De Gasperi - Peter Brown
Sgt Murray - Ian Mercer

Production
Gambon's casting was announced in May 2015. In June, it was announced that the actress Romola Garai had taken the role of Millie Appleyard.

Filming took place at West London Film Studios for various interior shots.

References

External links

Films about Winston Churchill
2016 British television series debuts
2016 television films
2016 films
British television films
2010s English-language films
Films directed by Charles Sturridge